The 1907 Kilkenny Senior Hurling Championship was the 19th staging of the Kilkenny Senior Hurling Championship since its establishment by the Kilkenny County Board.

On 2 August 1908, Tullaroan won the championship after a 2-06 to 1-03 defeat of Mooncoin in the final. This was their ninth championship title overall and their first in three championship seasons.

Results

Final

References

Kilkenny Senior Hurling Championship
Kilkenny Senior Hurling Championship